Christopher Adamson is a British actor.

He often portrays villains on film, such as in Judge Dredd (as Mean Machine Angel), Lighthouse, Pirates of the Caribbean: Dead Man's Chest, Pirates of the Caribbean: At World's End, and Freakshow.

Filmography 

Bullseye! (1990) .... Death's Head
Robin Hood: Prince of Thieves (1991) .... Soldier
Edward II (1991) .... Thug #3
Fool's Gold: The Story of the Brink's-Mat Robbery (1992, TV Movie) .... Winchester Warder 
The Young Americans (1993) .... Billy Cohen 
Dirty Weekend (1993) .... Serial Killer
The Three Musketeers (1993) .... Henri
The Magician (1993, TV Movie) .... Radio Operator 
Murder Most Horrid (1994-1999, TV Series) .... Mikey Perugiano / Mr. Beast
Beyond Bedlam (1994) .... Weasel
Beg! (1994) .... Detective Jarvis
Mad Dogs and Englishmen (1995) .... Max Quinlan
Judge Dredd (1995) .... Mean Machine
Cutthroat Island (1995) .... Dawg's Pirate
London's Burning (1996, TV Series) .... Metson
The Prince and the Pauper (1996, TV Series) .... Sentry
Crime Traveller (1997, TV Series) .... Crowley
The Fifth Element (1997) .... Airport Cop
The Bill (1997-2001, TV Series) .... Tam Morris / Bob Forrest
Jonathan Creek (1998, TV Series) .... The Stalker
Les Misérables (1998) .... Bertin
La vuelta de El Coyote (1998) .... Walker
Duck Patrol (1998, TV Series) .... Silty Moffat Jr.
Razor Blade Smile (1998) .... Sethane Blake
Lighthouse (1999) .... Leo Rook
Sacred Flesh (1999) .... Father Peter
Lock, Stock... (2000, TV Series) .... Three Feet
The Count of Monte Cristo (2002) .... Maurice
Murder in Mind (2002, TV Series) .... Detective Stetford
The Last Horror Movie (2003) .... Killer
Evil Aliens (2005) .... Llyr Williams / Alien Surgeon
The Rising: Ballad of Mangal Pandey (2005) .... Anson
Pirates of the Caribbean: Dead Man's Chest (2006) .... Jimmy Legs (Dutchman)
Freakshow (2007) .... Lon
Pirates of the Caribbean: At World's End (2007) .... Jimmy Legs (Dutchman)
Allan Quatermain and the Temple of Skulls (2008) .... Anisley Hartford
Mutant Chronicles (2008) .... Hodge
F (2010) .... Janitor
The Scared of Death Society (2010) .... Mr. Russell
The Shadow Line (2011, TV Series) .... Richards
The Great Ghost Rescue (2011) .... Man on a soap box
The Sleeping Room (2014) .... Fiskin
Legend (2015) .... Philip Testa
Leatherface (2017) .... Dr. Lang

External links 
 

Year of birth missing (living people)
Living people
English male film actors
English male television actors
Male actors from Surrey
People from Ewell
20th-century English male actors
21st-century English male actors